Amastra forbesi was a species of gastropod in the Amastridae family. It was endemic to Hawaii.

References

Amastra
Extinct gastropods
Taxonomy articles created by Polbot